Channa may refer to:

 Ahsaas Channa, Indian actress
 Ameet Channa, a popular British actor.
 Channa (Buddhist) was a royal servant of Prince Siddhartha who later became Gautama Buddha. Channa later became an arahant.
 Channa (tribe), a Sindhi tribe in Pakistan.
 Channa masala, a South Asian dish consisting of chickpeas (in Hindi and Urdu: Channa).
 Channa, a genus of the snakehead fishes.
 Humaira Channa, Pakistani singer.
 Mohammad Alam Channa, the world's tallest man.
Channa is the formal Chinese name for the Chan or Zen school of Buddhism.

See also
 Chana (disambiguation)